Nathaniel Allen Collins (born December 14, 1987) is a former American football defensive tackle. He has played for the Chicago Bears and Jacksonville Jaguars, after originally signing as an undrafted free agent with the New York Giants. He played college football at the University of Virginia.

Professional career

Jacksonville Jaguars
Collins was signed by the Jacksonville Jaguars on November 13, 2010. He played in one game in 2010 and 12 games during the 2011 season. He scored a touchdown in 2011 on a fumble recovery against the Tampa Bay Buccaneers. In February 2012, a Virginia state trooper arrested Collins and charged him with the possession of a small amount of marijuana. Less than a month later, the Jaguars rescinded the exclusive rights free agent tender placed on Collins, making him an unrestricted free agent, free to sign with any team.

Chicago Bears
Collins was signed by the Chicago Bears on May 23, 2012. On July 20, 2012, Collins was suspended for 1 game after violating the league's substance policy. In 2013, Collins was set to become a restricted free agent, though he was signed to a one-year deal on March 14. In week four against the New Orleans Saints, Collins tore his ACL, and missed the remainder of the season. Collins was placed on injured reserve on October 9. Two days before the start of the 2014 free agency period, Collins re-signed with the Bears on a one-year deal. The Bears released Collins on August 23, 2014.

Winnipeg Blue Bombers
Collins was signed as a free agent on April 10, 2015, by the Winnipeg Blue Bombers of the Canadian Football League.

Personal life
Collins attended King Low Heywood Thomas in Stamford, Connecticut. He graduated from University of Virginia with a Bachelor of Arts in Psychology on May 20, 2012.

In April 2011, Collins and New York Giants receiver Victor Cruz started the clothing brand, Young Whales. The line, a play on words of a high-stakes casino gambler "whale", was ready for purchase online by September 2011.

After his football career ended, Collins became a professional podcaster, working as a producer often referred to as “Doctor Facts” on the Green Light podcast, with former Virginia teammate and two-time NFL Super Bowl Champion Chris Long serving as the show’s host. 41-33.

References

External links

 Jacksonville Jaguars bio
 Chicago Bears bio

1987 births
Living people
People from White Plains, New York
Players of American football from New York (state)
Players of American football from Connecticut
American football defensive tackles
Virginia Cavaliers football players
New York Giants players
Jacksonville Jaguars players
Chicago Bears players
People from Port Chester, New York
Sportspeople from Westchester County, New York
Winnipeg Blue Bombers players